The Democratic Republic of the Congo–Rwanda border is a border between the two countries of Rwanda and the Democratic Republic of the Congo. Crossing Lake Kivu in its entirety through the Virunga Mountains down to Mount Karisimbi, it is 221 kilometers long, dividing the cities of Goma/Gisenyi and Bukavu/Cyangugu.

There was a brief border clash between the two countries in 2012, which resulted in a few soldiers being killed. Additional alleged cross-border shellings happened during a period of heightened tensions between the two countries.

References